Seret Scott (born September 1, 1949) is an American actress, director, and playwright, best known for her roles in the films Losing Ground and Pretty Baby, as well as guest appearances on the televisions shows The Equalizer, Miami Vice, and Cosby. She is also known for her theatrical roles on Broadway and the many plays she has directed on national and regional stages.

Seret Scott directed The Old Settler by John Henry Redwood at The Studio Theatre in Washington, D.C. in 1997.

Early life
Scott was born on September 1, 1949, in Washington D.C. She has referred to herself as “a child of the 60's,” as her youth in D.C. was marked by segregation and civil rights turmoil.  She began her career as an actress in 1969 when she left New York University, where she was studying, to join the Free Southern Theater, a community theater group allied with the civil rights movement that sought to introduce free, socially incisive theater for African Americans in the South.

Career

Stage
When she returned to New York City, Scott continued to participate in activist theatre, including anti-Vietnam performances and performances for inmates at Rikers and Sing Sing prisons.  She also began her off-Broadway career, appearing in the 1970 play Slave Ship at Theatre-in-the-Church in New York City.  In 1974, Scott appeared on Broadway as Sue Belle in Ray Aranha’s play My Sister, My Sister, for which she received a Drama Desk Award for Outstanding Performance.

Following her Broadway success, Scott went on to work as an actress for decades in New York City and around the country, including another appearance on Broadway in Ntozake Shange's 1976 play For Colored Girls Who Have Considered Suicide / When the Rainbow Is Enuf.

In 1989, Scott made her directorial debut with Some Sweet Day, written by Nancy Fales Garrett, which was reviewed favorably in the New York Times.  After this success, Scott transitioned full time into a career as a director and directed scores of plays off-Broadway and in regional theater productions, including at San Diego’s Old Globe Theatre, the Oregon Shakespeare Festival, and Chicago’s Court Theatre.

Film
Scott’s first screen role was as “Flora” in Pretty Baby, a 1978 drama directed by Louis Malle, starring Brooke Shields, Keith Carradine, and Susan Sarandon.

Scott’s most seminal role was as “Sara,” a professor of French philosophy navigating complicated relationships with her artist husband, her work, and other artists in the 1982 film Losing Ground, written and directed by Kathleen Collins.  The film was one of the first feature films ever directed by an African American woman. Although it won first prize at the Figueroa International Film Festival in Portugal, Losing Ground did not receive widespread attention until its rediscovery decades later.

In 2015, New York Times film critic A.O. Scott called Losing Ground  “a puzzle and a marvel,” and wrote that it “casts a highly individual spell.”  In 2019, The New Yorker film critic Richard Brody wrote that the film “reveals Collins to be one of the most accomplished and original filmmakers of her time.”  Scott’s role in the film followed her starring role in another of Collins’ productions, the play The Brothers at the American Place Theater in New York City in April 1982.

Scott went on to appear in various television series throughout the 1980s and 1990s, including Miami Vice and Cosby while continuing her career as a stage actress, director and playwright.

Filmography

Theatre actress

Films and television actress

Playwright

Theatre director

Personal life
Scott has been a resident of Teaneck, New Jersey.

References

External links 
 
 Theatre History Episode # 32 (podcast), Seret Scott Looks Back on the Free Southern Theater, 22 May 2017

1949 births
African-American film directors
American film directors
African-American dramatists and playwrights
20th-century American actresses
21st-century American actresses
African-American actresses
Living people
People from Teaneck, New Jersey
20th-century African-American women
20th-century African-American people
21st-century African-American women
21st-century African-American people